Clarence Forrest Burton (May 10, 1882  – December 2, 1933) was an American silent film actor.

Biography
Burton was born in Fort Lyon, in Benton County, Missouri and started in show business at the age of 5, playing stock and musical comedy in road productions. He was signed into films in late 1912 and starred in 132 films between 1913 and 1932.

By late 1920, Burton had become heavy enough to be considered unsuited for his typical villainous roles in films. A trainer supervised a program of exercise and diet until Burton had lost enough weight to be cast in the Paramount film The Jacklins.

He died of a heart attack in 1933 at the age of 51 in Hollywood, California. His interment was located at Hollywood Forever Cemetery, but was removed on September 6, 1950.

Partial filmography

 The Werewolf (1913)
 The Sign of the Spade (1916)
 The Twinkler (1916) as Boss Corregan
 Beloved Rogues (1917) as Jack Kennedy
 My Fighting Gentleman (1917) as Isiah Gore
 The Spender (1919)
 The Last of the Duanes (1919) as Bland
 Wings of the Morning (1919) as Taung Si Ali
 The Return of Mary (1919) as John Denby
 Six Feet Four (1919)
 Castles in the Air (1919)
 The Six Best Cellars (1920) as Henry Carpenter
 Thou Art the Man (1920) as Matt Solomon
 Forbidden Fruit (1921) as Steve Maddock
 The Lost Romance (1921)
 Crazy to Marry (1921) as Gregory Slade (a lawyer)
 Miss Lulu Bett (1921) as Ninian Deacon
 Fool's Paradise (1921) as Manuel
 Her Husband's Trademark (1922)
 The Impossible Mrs. Bellew (1922)
 The Beautiful and Damned (1922) as Bloeckman
 Adam's Rib (1923) as Cave Man
 Garrison's Finish (1923)
The Satin Girl (1923)
 The Ten Commandments (1923) as the Taskmaster (prologue)
 The Mine with the Iron Door (1924)
 No More Women (1924) as Beef Hogan
 The Navigator (1924) as Spy (uncredited)
 The Road to Yesterday (1925) as Hugh Armstrong
 The Coming of Amos (1925)
 The Wedding Song (1925)
 The Million Dollar Handicap (1925)
 Savages of the Sea (1925)
 Shipwrecked (1926)
 The Danger Girl (1926)
 The Warning Signal (1926)
 The Nervous Wreck (1926)
 Rubber Tires (1927) as Mexican
 The King of Kings (1927)
 A Harp in Hock (1927)
 Chicago (1927)
 Stool Pigeon (1928)
 Stand and Deliver (1928)
 The Younger Generation (1929)
 The Godless Girl (1929)
 Barnum Was Right (1929)
 The Love Racket (1929)
 The Unholy Three (1930)
 The Love Trader (1930)
 The Sign of the Cross (1932) as Servillius

References

External links

1882 births
1933 deaths
19th-century American male actors
American male stage actors
20th-century American male actors
American male child actors
American male silent film actors
Male actors from Missouri
People from Benton County, Missouri